Lady, la vendedora de rosas, is a Colombian telenovela produced by Teleset for Sony Pictures Television and RCN Televisión.

Plot 
Lady, la vendedora de rosas, is a story based on the real life of Lady Tabares, a woman who has the life of a movie. Lady was raised in one of the poorest and most crime-ridden neighborhoods in Medellin. She grew up sleeping on the streets and begging for a living before she was sent to an orphanage. She eventually left the orphanage after reuniting with her family and in her teens she dedicated herself to selling roses on the streets. By a twist of fate she is chosen to star in the movie La vendedora de rosas, a movie that won many awards in several international festivals turning her into a star. Unfortunately the fame that was easy to get was easy to lose and Lady eventually returned to her old neighborhood to sell roses. The worst then comes when she is sentenced to 26 years in prison for being involved in the death of a man. Lady protested her innocence but was forced to carry out her sentence. While in jail she faced many hardships and struggled for 13 years while maintaining a relationship with her children only via telephone all the while suffering from an unstable physical and psychological condition.

Cast 
Natalia Reyes as Lady Tabares
 as Child Lady Tabares
Majida Issa as Fátima Tabares
Ernesto Benjumea as Marco García
Alberto Cardeño as Pacho Rojas
Patricia Tamayo as Rosalba Jaramillo
Yuri Vargas as Yurani Bueno Restrepo
María José Vargas as Yurani
Fabio Restrepo as Don Elmer
Víctor Hugo Trespalacios as Adolfo Candamil
Julián Román as Treinta y Ocho
Jennifer Arenas as Mireya
Juan Camilo Pérez as Giovanni Quiñones "el propio"
Carolina López as Liliana Rojas Jaramillo
Sara Pinzón as Liliana
Diego Garzón as Didier Briñez
Mario Andrés Guerrero as Child Didier Briñez
Pepe Sánchez as Don Arturo "el Gargamel"
Rodolfo Silva as Olegario Pérez
Aura Helena Prada as Hermana Ángela
Jair Arango Meneses as Chucha
Andrés Felipe Torres as Fabián Garcés
Viña Machado as Brigit Restrepo
Carlos Mariño as Albeiro Bueno
Juan Pablo Barragán as Arturo "el Mono"
Alejandro Buitrago as Bartolo
Orlando Valenzuela as Chumbimba
María Irene Toro as La Fiscal
Julieth Restrepo as Sofía Soto
Maia Landaburu as Norma
Brian Moreno as Alex Candamil
Samuel Muños as Alex

References

External links 

2015 telenovelas
Spanish-language telenovelas
Colombian telenovelas
2015 Colombian television series debuts
2015 Colombian television series endings
RCN Televisión telenovelas
Television shows set in Cartagena, Colombia
Television shows set in Cannes
Television series by Teleset
Sony Pictures Television telenovelas